Suicide Blondes can mean:

The tag team later known as Edge and Christian.
The tag team/stable consisting of Chris Candido, Johnny Hotbody and Chris Michaels.
Suicide Blondes, the tag team of LuFisto and Jennifer Blake